Faster Payment System (FPS; , more commonly known as 轉數快) is a real-time gross settlement payment system in Hong Kong that connects traditional banks and electronic payment and digital wallet operators. Users are able to perform instant money transfer or make payment to merchants by using the recipient's phone number, e-mail or QR code that contains the user's numeric identifier. Using the "traditional way" of full name and account number to make interbank transfer is also allowed.

The system was implemented by the Hong Kong Monetary Authority and operated by Hong Kong Interbank Clearing Limited (HKICL). It was launched for pre-registration on 17 September 2018. Transfers and payments is available since 30 September 2018.

Features

Cheap transfers 

Traditional interbank transfers required payment of fees between 50 HKD and 200 HKD, or a waiting time of up to two days before the payment clears. FPS provides an instant, round-the-clock and cheap way of transferring funds. For personal banks accounts, interbank fund transfer through FPS is normally free of service charges.

Payment by QR code 

Participants in the FPS share a common standard for the QR code which allows paying to merchants using a variety of payment methods like bank cards, stored value facilities or direct debit from bank accounts.

HKMA has released a tool for merchants to convert QR codes from different payment providers into a single standard QR code.

Currencies 

FPS supports payments in Hong Kong dollars (HKD) and Chinese Yuan Renminbi (CNY).

Notable participants

Traditional banks 
Bank of China (Hong Kong) 
Bank of Communications
Bank of East Asia
China Citic Bank International 
China Construction Bank (Asia) 
Chiyu Banking Corporation 
Chong Hing Bank 
Citibank (Hong Kong) 
CMB Wing Lung Bank
Dah Sing Bank 
DBS Bank (Hong Kong) 
Hang Seng Bank
HSBC (The Hongkong and Shanghai Banking Corporation) 
Industrial and Commercial Bank of China (Asia) 
Nanyang Commercial Bank 
OCBC Wing Hang Bank 
United Overseas Bank
Shanghai Commercial Bank 
Standard Chartered (Hong Kong)
ZA Bank Limited

E-wallet operators 
 AlipayHK
 Tap & Go (HKT Payment Limited)
 Octopus Wallet (Octopus Cards Limited)
 WeChat Pay HK
 PayMe
 5D Pay (Yintran Group Holdings Limited)
 (TNG Wallet HK)

Incidents

October 2018 
After 3 weeks of launching FPS in Hong Kong, there were several cases of fraud reported to Hong Kong Police that involved a combined loss of HKD 180,000 to customers. After the incidents were found, HKMA suspended the functions of top up to all e-wallets operators until security issue fixed. Few days later, it was revealed that more than 10 suspected cases were reported and the loss was surged to HKD 400,000.

See also 

 Clearing House Automated Transfer System, the original (but still operational) RTGS system in Hong Kong

References

External links 
 

2018 establishments in Hong Kong
Payment clearing systems
Banking in Hong Kong
Banking technology